Guriqbal Kaur is an Indian politician from the state of Punjab who was a member of the Punjab Legislative Assembly.

Constituency
Kaur represented the Nawan Shahr Assembly Constituency in Punjab.

Political party
Kaur is a  member of the Indian National Congress.

Kaur was one of the 42 Indian National Congress MLAs who submitted their resignations in protest at a decision of the Supreme Court of India ruling that Punjab's termination of the Sutlej-Yamuna Link (SYL) water canal was unconstitutional.

Personal life
Kaur was married to Parkash Singh who was a member of the Punjab Legislative Assembly from 2002 to 2007 from the Nawan Shahr constituency. The seat was given to her after his death in 2010, and she represented it from 2012 to 2017. She was succeeded as MLA by her son Angad Singh Saini.

References

External links
 Member of Legislative Assembly

People from Punjab, India
Living people
Year of birth missing (living people)
Indian National Congress politicians from Punjab, India
Punjab, India MLAs 2012–2017